John Rush (February 21, 1837 – April 29, 1916) was a first class fireman in the Union Navy during the American Civil War, where he earned the Medal of Honor. Rush was born in Washington, D.C., on February 21, 1837, and later changed his name to Israel W. Little.

Military service 
Rush entered Service in the US Navy from Washington, D.C., and eventually rose to the rank of first class fireman during the Civil War. On March 14, 1863, he committed the act that would merit him the Medal of Honor. On that day, the squadron attempted to head up the river towards the enemy port, with their ship second in line. The ship was hit and damaged by a 6-inch solid rifle shot which shattered the starboards safety-valve chamber and port safety valve as it rounded a bend beneath the fortifications. The ship was forced to withdraw, as the steam room was filled with hot steam. After realising the ship was in danger of exploding, Fireman Joseph Vantine, Second Class Fireman John Hickman, First Class Fireman Mathew McClelland, and Fireman First Class John Rush, wrapped the wet cloth around their faces and entered the hot steam room to haul out the fires, relieving each other when they were overcome by heat. Their actions saved the ship, and led to each of them being awarded a Medal of Honor.

Medal of Honor citation 
Rush was given his Medal of Honor through the War Department, General Orders No. 17 on July 10, 1863:

Serving on board the U.S.S. Richmond in the attack on Port Hudson, 14 March 1863. Damaged by a 6-inch solid rifle shot which shattered the starboard safety-valve chamber and also damaged the port safety valve, the fireroom of the Richmond immediately became filled with steam to place it in an extremely critical condition. Acting courageously in this crisis, Rush persisted in penetrating the steam-filled room in order to haul the hot fires of the furnaces, and continued this action until the gravity of the situation had been lessened.

Post-war 
After the Civil War, Rush returned to his home in Washington, D.C.. There, he changed his name to Israel W. Little, and married his wife, Elizabeth Kearney Little. He died on April 29, 1916, at the age of 79, and was buried in Arlington National Cemetery.

References 

1837 births
1916 deaths
American Civil War recipients of the Medal of Honor
United States Navy Medal of Honor recipients
United States Navy sailors
Union Navy sailors
People of Washington, D.C., in the American Civil War
People from Washington, D.C.
Burials at Arlington National Cemetery